Vesime is a comune (municipality) in the Province of Asti in the Italian region Piedmont, located about  southeast of Turin and about  south of Asti.

Vesime borders the following municipalities: Castino, Cessole, Cossano Belbo, Perletto, Roccaverano, Rocchetta Belbo, and San Giorgio Scarampi.

Demographic evolution

References

External links
 www.comune.vesime.at.it

Cities and towns in Piedmont